Nycteroleteridae is a family of procolophonian parareptilians (extinct early reptiles) from the Middle to Late Permian of Russia and North America. They are sometimes classified as a sister group to pareiasaurids (but see Classification). The group includes the genera Macroleter, Bashkyroleter, "Bashkyroleter" mesensis, Nycteroleter, Emeroleter, and probably Rhipaeosaurus. They were carnivorous, and occasionally ate insects. The group was most common in European Russia, with only a few fossils in North America. One fossil has also been found in Africa, but this is the only one from Gondwana.

Classification 
Nycteroleteridae is sometimes considered a sister group to the Pareiasauridae, but Bayesian inference suggests that it was in fact paraphyletic, with Rhipaeosaurus a basal member of the Pareiasauridae and other members of the Nycteroleteridae as outgroups. This is supported by the appearance of Rhipaeosaurus''' skull and teeth - it had tricuspid teeth and multiple horns on the skull, resembling a pareiasaur but smaller and with a longer tail. For this reason it is often seen as intermediate between more primitive nycteroleterids and more advanced pareiasaurids such as Scutosaurus. Subdivisions 

 Subfamily † Nycteroleterinae
 †Nycteroleter †Emeroleter Unassigned subfamily
 †Bashkyroleter † Bashykroleter mesensis †Macroleter †Rhipaeosaurus Features 
As discussed above, Nycteroleteridae technically includes all pareiasaurs as well as the five given genera. Within the five genera mentioned, there seems to be a smooth gradient of form from Macroleter to Rhipaeosaurus. Where Macroleter has no horns, Emeroleter has a few small horns, and Rhipaeosaurus' horns are quite large.

However, there are some characteristic features of the Nycteroleteridae. They have a deeply incised otic notch, postparietal bones that enter the pineal opening, regular circular pits in the skull, and a row of palatal teeth from the interpterygoid vacuity to the edge of the choana.

Examination of the nycteroleterids' middle ear bones and comparison with living amniotes showed that they probably had efficient impedance-matching hearing. This suggests that they may have been active at night or in dim-light environments. They are thought to have been carnivorous or insectivorous, but Rhipaeosaurus'' may have been an omnivore.

References

Prehistoric reptile families
Extinct reptiles
Permian reptiles of North America
Reptiles of Russia
Guadalupian first appearances
Lopingian extinctions
Pareiasauromorphs